"Don't Waste My Time" is the debut song recorded by American country music group Little Big Town.  It was released in March 2002 as the first single from the album Little Big Town.  The song reached #33 on the Billboard Hot Country Singles & Tracks chart.  The song was written by all four members of the group, along with Irene Kelley and Clay Mills.

Chart performance

References

2002 debut singles
2002 songs
Little Big Town songs
Songs written by Karen Fairchild
Songs written by Kimberly Schlapman
Songs written by Phillip Sweet
Songs written by Jimi Westbrook
Songs written by Irene Kelley
Songs written by Clay Mills
Song recordings produced by Blake Chancey
Monument Records singles